Mida may refer to:

Mida, Lorestan, a village in Iran
Mida (website), Israeli online magazine
Lucia Mida, a golfer
MIDA
MIDA, (Brand), Motorcycle Helmet and Accessories Brand, British Design.
Mida, a genus of Santalaceae